Diane Williams is a retired World class sprinter  who ran 100 m and 4x100 m relays.  She was born 14 December 1960 in Chicago, Illinois, U.S.A

1980 Olympics
Williams qualified for the 1980 U.S. Olympic team but was unable to compete due to the 1980 Summer Olympics boycott. In 2007 she did receive one of 461 Congressional Gold Medals created especially for the spurned athletes.

World Athletics Championships
Her best performances came in the first two World Athletics Championships in 1983 and 1987. In Helsinki in 1983 she was a Bronze medallist over 100 m. In 1987 she was fourth over 100 m and won gold as part of the 4x100 relay team, their winning time of 41.58 CBP secs is still one of the fastest in history.  In 1988, she was 2nd to Florence Griffith Joyner's world record time of 10.49 in the 100m.

Aftermath
Diane has admitted to using performance-enhancing drugs during her career in the era preceding random out of competition testing. However, she managed to compete without the use of drugs through the 1987 season and ran faster than ever. She now tours schools where she relates her abuse of steroids and the struggle to regain her health in the aftermath of her career. An auto biography,  True to Me,  was published a few years ago which chronicles the aforementioned battle to perform clean at the highest level.

Height 1.63 m Weight 54 kg.

Personal bests

References

Sources
The International Track and Field Annual 1988/89

1960 births
Living people
Track and field athletes from Chicago
American female sprinters
Doping cases in athletics
American sportspeople in doping cases
Athletes (track and field) at the 1987 Pan American Games
Pan American Games silver medalists for the United States
World Athletics Championships medalists
Pan American Games medalists in athletics (track and field)
Congressional Gold Medal recipients
Goodwill Games medalists in athletics
USA Outdoor Track and Field Championships winners
World Athletics Championships winners
Competitors at the 1986 Goodwill Games
Medalists at the 1987 Pan American Games
21st-century American women